Mount Melania is a prominent rounded hill,  high, at the north end of Black Island, in the Ross Archipelago, Antarctica. It was first climbed by Hartley T. Ferrar and Louis Bernacchi of the British National Antarctic Expedition, 1901–04. The name, from a Greek word connoting the color black, an appropriate name for a feature on Black Island, was given by the New Zealand Geological Survey Antarctic Expedition in 1958–59.

See also
Melania Ridge, a basalt ridge running southeast for 3 nautical miles (6 km) from Mount Melania

References

External links

Volcanoes of the Ross Dependency
Black Island (Ross Archipelago)
Pleistocene lava domes